The expression grüß Gott (from grüß dich Gott, originally '(may) God bless (you)') is a greeting, less often a farewell, in Southern Germany and Austria (more specifically the Upper German Sprachraum, especially in Bavaria, Franconia, Swabia, Austria, and South Tyrol).

Overview
The greeting, along with its variants, has long been the most common greeting in Southern Germany and Austria.

It is sometimes misunderstood by speakers from other regions to mean the imperative greet God(!) and therefore often receives a sarcastic response from Northern (and thus mainly Protestant) Germans such as "If I see Him" ("Wenn ich Ihn sehe") or "Hopefully not too soon" ("Hoffentlich nicht so bald"). Grüß Gott is however the shortened form of both (es) grüße dich Gott and its plural (es) grüße euch Gott (literally in modern German 'may God greet you'). In addition, in Middle High German, the verb grüßen (grüezen) used to mean not only 'to greet' but also 'to bless', so the greeting in fact preserves the original meaning 'God bless you', though even speakers in Southern Germany and Austria are only very rarely aware of this and think it means 'may God greet you'. 

Such a religious expression in a greeting only exists in a few countries. For example, people wish one another a simple 'good day' in France (bonjour), Poland (dzień dobry), Spain (buenos días), and Portugal (bom dia), while in Irish the popular greeting is Dia dhuit (singular) or Dia dhaoibh (plural, meaning 'God with you' in both cases), similar to the English goodbye, a contraction of God be with ye; today, goodbye has a less obviously religious meaning. Also similar to the Catalan formal expression adéu-siau ("be with God", in archaic Catalan). A religious origin is still obvious in French adieu, Spanish adiós, Italian addio, Portuguese adeus, and Catalan adéu ("to God", probably a contraction of "I entrust you to God"). In Finland, a religious group named Laestadians uses the form "Jumalan terve" ("God's greeting").

Like many other greetings, grüß Gott can range in meaning from deeply emotional to casual or perfunctory. The greeting's pronunciation varies with the region, with, for example, grüß dich sometimes shortened to grüß di (the variation grüß di Gott may be heard in some places). In Bavaria and Austria griaß di and griaß eich are commonly heard, although their Standard German equivalents are not uncommon either. A common farewell analogous to grüß Gott is pfiat' di Gott, a contraction of "behüte dich Gott" ('God protect you'), which itself is not common at all. This is likewise shortened this to pfiat' di/eich or, if the person is addressed formally pfia Gott in Altbayern, Austria, and South Tyrol (Italy).

In its standard German form, grüß Gott is mostly stressed on the second word and in many places is used not only in everyday life, but is also common in the official communications of the aforementioned states. Use of the greeting guten Tag ('good day') is less prevalent, but there are those who dislike grüß Gott on account of its religious nature. In Bavaria, guten Tag is considered prim and distant and sometimes leads to misunderstandings.

In Slovakia, the literal Slovak translation of grüß Gott , Zdar Boh! is used as the traditional greeting of miners. Inscription Zdar Boh! can be seen on many mine entrances, monuments or logos.
In Romania, the greeting "Doamne ajută", which means "God helps" or "God bless", is often used. On the Romanian mine entrances „Noroc bun!” is used - same as for saluting other miners.

See also 
 Greetings
 Moin
 Servus

References

External links 
  

German words and phrases
Greeting words and phrases